Tylomelania insulaesacrae is a species of freshwater snail with an operculum, an aquatic gastropod mollusk in the family Pachychilidae.

Distribution 
This species occurs in Malili lakes, Sulawesi, Indonesia. It occur in the single lake and the type locality is the lake Towuti.

Description 
The width of the shell is 8 mm. The height of the shell is 16 mm. The width of the aperture is 4 mm. The height of the aperture is 7.5 mm.

References

External links 
 von Rintelen T. & Glaubrecht M. (2005). "Anatomy of an adaptive radiation: a unique reproductive strategy in the endemic freshwater gastropod Tylomelania (Cerithioidea: Pachychilidae) on Sulawesi, Indonesia and its biogeographical implications." Biological Journal of the Linnean Society 85: 513–542. .

insulaesacrae
Gastropods described in 1897